Monfwi is a territorial electoral district for the Legislative Assembly of the Northwest Territories, Canada. The district consists of the four Tłı̨chǫ communities of Behchokǫ̀, Gamèti, Wekweètì and Whatì.

Its Member of the Legislative Assembly is Jane Weyallon Armstrong.

Renaming
The electoral district was renamed from North Slave to Monfwi on August 4, 2005. The date was chosen to coincide with the date the Tlicho Land Claim and Self-Government Agreement came into effect. The name change effected Jackson Lafferty who was elected in a by-election on July 18, 2005 and took his seat in the legislature on August 11, 2005. He was still considered to be elected as the elected member for the North Slave riding despite being sworn in after the name was changed.

Members of the Legislative Assembly (MLAs)

Election results

2021 by-election

2019 election

2015 election

2011 election

2007 election

2003 election

1999 election

Notes

References

External links 
Website of the Legislative Assembly of Northwest Territories

Northwest Territories territorial electoral districts